Antoniev may refer to:

Antoniev Monastery in Veliky Novgorod, Russia
Antonievo-Siysky Monastery in Archangelsk Oblast, Russia